The Women's Hammer Throw event at the 2000 Summer Olympics as part of the athletics program was held at the Olympic Stadium on Wednesday, 27 September and Friday, 29 September.

The qualifying athletes progressed through to the final where the qualifying distances are scrapped and they start afresh with up to six throws. The qualifying distance was 65.50 metres. For all qualifiers who did not achieve the standard, the remaining spaces in the final were filled by the longest throws until a total of 12 qualifiers.

Medalists

Schedule
All times are Australian Eastern Standard Time (UTC+10)

Abbreviations

Records

Qualifying

Group A

Group B

Overall Qualifying results

Final

See also
 2000 Hammer Throw Year Ranking

References

External links
Official Report
todor66

J
Hammer throw at the Olympics
2000 in women's athletics
Women's events at the 2000 Summer Olympics